Justice Newton may refer to:

John E. Newton (judge) (1904–1984), justice of the Nebraska Supreme Court
Richard Newton (justice) (died 1448), English chief justice of the Common Pleas
Roderick Newton (born 1958), justice of the High Court of England and Wales